2011 referendum may refer to:

 2009–2011 Catalan independence referendums
 2011 Egyptian constitutional referendum
 2011 Irish constitutional referendums
 2011 Italian referendums
 2011 Liberian constitutional referendum
 2011 Liechtenstein referendums
 2011 Moroccan constitutional referendum
 2011 New Zealand voting system referendum
 2011 Palauan casino referendum
 2011 Seoul free lunch referendum
 2011 South Ossetian referendum
 2011 South Sudanese independence referendum
 2011 United Kingdom Alternative Vote referendum
 Results of the 2011 United Kingdom Alternative Vote referendum
 2011 Welsh devolution referendum

See also